NGO Fractal is a non-governmental organisation from Serbia that works on improving communication and cooperation of people from different backgrounds. It is a think tank organisation that engages itself in the discussion of issues such as security, Serb-Albanian dialogues, energy, economy, self-advocacy and social-political problems; one of its aims being to help raise awareness about such topics worldwide.

NGO Fractal is a member of EPLO (European Peacebuilding Liaison Office), making it an internationally recognised non-governmental organisation whose origins are from Serbia.

Background
NGO Fractal was founded by twelve people of different educational and professional backgrounds, and its current chairman is Filip Pavlović. It has been involved in numerous projects, most famous being Project Enclavia  which concentrates on reintegrating the alienated Serbian population into everyday life in Kosovo.

References

External links
 EPLO's website
 Fractal's website
 Article about one of Fractal's projects in Borba newspaper
 Article on Fractal's Kosovo project in B92 news 

Think tanks based in Serbia